Events from the year 1586 in Ireland.

Incumbent
Monarch: Elizabeth I

Events
September 23 – Battle of Ardnaree in County Mayo: English troops under Sir Richard Bingham, governor of Connacht, defeat an Irish-Scottish mercenary army – led by the brothers Donald Gorm MacDonald of Carey and Alexander Carragh MacDonald of Glenarm (both of whom are killed) – fighting on behalf of the rebel Mac Philbins and Burkes.
c. December? – Richard Creagh, Roman Catholic Archbishop of Armagh, dies a prisoner in the Tower of London.
County Longford is shired, separating it from Westmeath.
Robert Gardiner is appointed Lord Chief Justice of Ireland.
Sir Edward Waterhouse is appointed Chancellor of the Exchequer of Ireland.
Elizabeth I of England and James VI of Scotland agree in the Treaty of Berwick that the MacDonnell family, claimants to the Glens of Antrim, have the right to stay in Ireland.

Births
Antony Hickey, Franciscan theologian (d. 1641)
William St Leger, Anglo-Irish landowner and military commander (d. 1642)

Deaths
May 5 – Henry Sidney, Lord Deputy of Ireland (b. 1529)
c. December? – Richard Creagh, Roman Catholic Archbishop of Armagh (b. c.1523)

References

 
1580s in Ireland
Ireland
Years of the 16th century in Ireland